Interstate Music is one of the largest musical instrument retailers in the U.S., with its headquarters in Menomonee Falls, Wisconsin. Interstate Music owns and operates Internet retail operations through the InterstateMusic.com e-commerce domain. For nearly 70 years, Interstate Music has been a key for national player in the music products industry through its multi-channel retail, wholesale, and manufacturing operations.

History 
Frank Cascio, the son of Italian immigrants, discovered a passion for music by playing an old piano in the back room of the Milwaukee neighborhood grocery store founded by his parents Rosario and Concetta. 
He eventually mastered the accordion and played live on local radio stations. After completing his service as a corpsman in the US Army in the Philippines, Cascio and his wife Marcie founded the West Milwaukee Accordion School on Beloit Road in West Milwaukee. Besides giving lessons and selling accordions, the store also sold Motorola televisions and radios.

In 1951, Cascio turned down a chance to join the famous Lawrence Welk Orchestra, and instead built a larger, new Cascio Music store on Lincoln Avenue in nearby West Allis. The new store added sheet music and lessons, with as many as 600 music lessons taught weekly by a staff of 40 instructors, with accordion lessons being the most popular.

A mail order division, Interstate Music Supply, began in 1970, initially with a small flyer to service regional school band directors in the far corners of Wisconsin, but which eventually grew into larger catalogs. In 1973, a second location, Cascio Music-West, was added in the rural New Berlin suburb of Milwaukee, to house Interstate Music Supply and a small retail outlet to mostly handle instrument rentals. The New Berlin store grew and eventually replaced the Lincoln Avenue store, which closed in 1976. Shortly after, Cascio sold the sheet music side of the business to Eric and Trudy Metz, and Metz's Sheet Music World rented space inside Cascio Music until Eric Metz's death in 1996. In 1998, Cascio re-acquired Metz's Sheet Music World and incorporated it in Cascio Music's operations.

Cascio Interstate Music began publishing the Interstate Musician Drum Catalog in 1993, followed by Guitar/Bass and Keyboard/MIDI Catalog, which drove major growth in the company's mail order operations in the 1990s. The school music catalog for band directors continued as well. A warehouse was added to the back of the store to handle this growing mail order business.

The company relocated its warehouse to a much larger,  facility in Waukesha, allowing further retail expansion of the drum, guitar, and pro audio departments, including a dedicated acoustic guitar "cabin," a cymbal room, plus separate wind instrument tryout rooms.

In 1997, Frank S. Cascio died at age 76, and his son Mike assumed ownership of the business. The company opened additional retail locations in the Milwaukee suburbs of Mequon and Hartland, but both were closed in 2003. In 2000, the company established www.interstatemusic.com and developed it into a full-featured e-commerce website over the next decade.

In 2003, Mike Cascio formed an advisory board, where he met Michael R. Houser, former Vice Chairman, Executive Vice President and Chief Marketing Officer of Fresh Brands, Inc.. Houser had also served on the Executive Committee and Board of Directors of Summerfest organizer World Festivals, Inc.. In 2004, Houser became Cascio Interstate Music's Chief Executive Officer/Chief Marketing Officer, and in 2005, Elwood Winn, former Fresh Brands President and CEO, joined Cascio Music as Chief Financial Officer.

In 2020, Wisconsin-based Geneva Supply acquired Cascio Interstate Music through a voluntary receivership and rebranded the company Interstate Music.

Proprietary Musical Instrument Brands 
ARU Music is Cascio’s division encompassing proprietary brands of musical instruments. ARU's original and primary instrument lines are Archer Guitars and Amps, Union Drums and Ravel Band Instruments. Additional brands developed in recent years include M. Ravel String Instruments, le'Var Band Instruments, Melokia and Omâlha Ukuleles, Union One Earth Percussion and Gravity Pedals.

CEO Michael Houser provides the marketing and brand oversight for these brands and introduces them to new markets via non-traditional, large retailers, along with obtaining and expanding artist endorsements. Artist endorsers for Archer Guitars and Union Drums include Todd Rundgren, Kasim Sulton, Shonn Hinton (Mary J Blige), Sean Carey and Josh Rouse.

Involvement in Milwaukee's Music Community 

Cascio Interstate Music is an active participant in southeastern Wisconsin's musical community, by providing free in-store educational/performance clinics with well-known musicians at the retail store. Cascio Interstate Music has also entered into a partnership with the NBA’s Milwaukee Bucks franchise to sponsor the "Bucks Beats" Drumline, which performs during Milwaukee Bucks home basketball games. Cascio Interstate Music also maintains relationships with the Stefanie H Weill Center for the Performing Arts, Sharon Lynne Wilson Center for the Arts, 88Nine Radio Milwaukee, and Milwaukee Record.

DrummerFest 

Cascio Interstate Music has been hosting DrummerFest, an annual drum clinic, since 2001. The day-long event is free of charge and features notable drummers and percussionists from a variety of genres. Attendees have the opportunity to participate in interactive sessions with the performers, as well as meet-and-greets.

Awards 
The following is a partial list of awards given to Cascio Interstate Music:
 Zildjian Outstanding Dealer Award 2014
 Vic Firth Outstanding Retailer Award 2014
 Music Inc. Magazine Marketing & Promotions Award 2007
 WISN A-List Best Musical Instruments Award 2008-2010, 2012-2014
 NAMM Top 100 Dealers of Music Products and Instruments in America 2012
 Drum Workshop's National Independent Dealer of the Year 2005-2006
 Music & Sound Retailer Best Single-Store Percussion Dealer 2012
 Shepherd Express Best of Milwaukee - Musical Instrument Store 2007, 2008, 2009, 2010, 2011, 2012, 2013, 2014, 2015, 2016, 2018

References

External links 
 InterstateMusic.com

Musical instrument retailers of the United States
Online music stores of the United States
American companies established in 1946
Retail companies established in 1946
Retail companies based in Wisconsin
Consumer electronics retailers in the United States